FRAP or frap may stand for:

Acronym

 Facilitated Risk Analysis Process
 Federal Rules of Appellate Procedure
 Ferric Reducing Ability of Plasma, also Ferric ion reducing antioxidant power, a simple assay of antioxidant content in foods
 Fluorescence recovery after photobleaching, an experimental technique in cell biology.
 Fluoride-resistant acid phosphatase
 Frenetic Random Activity Periods / Frenetic Random Acts of Play / Frantic Running and Playing (dog behavior and cat behavior)
 Frente de Acción Popular, a Chilean coalition gathering left-wing parties from 1956 to 1969
 Frente Revolucionario Antifascista y Patriótico (Revolutionary Anti-Fascist Patriotic Front), a Marxist–Leninist revolutionary organization (1971–1978) using violence against Francoist Spain
 Front d'action politique, a municipal political party in Montreal
 Front d'action politique (known as just FRAP), the 2nd largest municipal party in Montreal in 1969–1971.
Front Révolutionnaire d’Action Prolétarienne, a far-left terrorist organisation active in Belgium.

Word

A method of tightening a lashing (ropework) by wrapping the rope around the lashing's core to help enforce it.
An abbreviation for Frappuccino, a trademarked coffee beverage.
Frapping, an alternate term for clawhammer banjo technique.

See also
 Frop (disambiguation).
 Fraps, the video utility software.